Lee Harris (born October 16, 1981) is a former pair skater who competed internationally for the United States. With partner Colette Appel, he is the 2002 U.S. national junior champion and placed 12th at the 2002 World Junior Championships. They were fourth at two ISU Junior Grand Prix events and on the senior level at the 2003 Finlandia Trophy.

In 2006, Harris began his professional skating career while on tour with Royal Caribbean Cruise ships. He retired from professional skating in 2011 and he currently coaches at the Chiller Skating Rinks in Columbus, Ohio.

In 2012 and 2013 Harris became a National Level Figure Skating Coach when his Novice pair team competed at the U.S. National figure skating championships.

Harris also played Jr. Hockey for the Belle River Canadians and Kingsville Comets in the GLJCHL from 1996-1999.

In 2014, Harris was hired by the Columbus Blue Jackets (NHL) as their skating coach. Harris works with both the Columbus Blue Jackets players and their AHL affiliate team.

In 2017, Harris was added onto the Ohio State Buckeyes men's ice hockey team's coaching staff as the on-ice conditioning specialist (consultant).

Programs 
(with Colette Appel)

Results
(pairs with Colette Appel)

References

External links
 
 Colette Appel / Lee Harris at Tracings.net
 Chiller Staff Page
 (http://bluejacketsxtra.dispatch.com/content/stories/2015/07/03/Blue-Jackets-0703.html)

1981 births
American male pair skaters
Canadian emigrants to the United States
Living people
Skating people from Ontario
Sportspeople from Windsor, Ontario